Cnemidophorus arubensis, the Aruba whiptail, or cododo is a species of whiptail lizard in the genus Cnemidophorus. It is found on the island of Aruba. They are considered the most abundant lizard species on the island of Aruba.

Diet
Aruba whiptails are omnivorous, eating both insects and plant matter. They contribute to the dispersal of seeds for certain species of plants by eating the fruit and excreting the seeds in a different location.

Reproduction
Unlike some other members of the genus Cnemidophorus, the Aruba whiptail reproduces sexually.

References

Cnemidophorus
Reptiles described in 1887
Reptiles of the Caribbean
Fauna of Aruba
Taxa named by Theodorus Willem van Lidth de Jeude